Hoka! Hoka! Hoka! is a collection of science fiction stories by Poul Anderson and Gordon Dickson. It was first published by Baen Books in 1998 and reprints the authors' earlier collection, Earthman's Burden, expanding with two additional stories from Hoka!. The story "Don Jones" originally appeared in Earthman's Burden. The other stories originally appeared in the magazines Other Worlds, Universe and Fantasy and Science Fiction.

Contents
 Prologue
 "The Sheriff of Canyon Gulch"    
 Interlude I
 "Don Jones"
 Interlude II
 "In Hoka Signo Vinces"
 Interlude III
 "The Adventure of the Misplaced Hound"
 Interlude IV
 "Yo Ho Hoka!"
 Interlude V
 "The Tiddlywink Warriors"
 Interlude VI
 "Joy in Mudville"
 "Undiplomatic Immunity"
 Mysterious Message

See also
Hoka!

Sources

External links 
 

1998 short story collections
Short story collections by Poul Anderson
Short story collections by Gordon R. Dickson